A three-question referendum was held in Bulgaria on 6 November 2016 alongside presidential elections. Voters were asked whether they supported limiting public funding of political parties to one lev per year per valid vote received at the previous elections, the introduction of compulsory voting in elections and referendums, and changing the electoral system for the National Assembly to the two-round system. In order to be binding, the number of voters participating in the referendum must be equal to or higher than the number who voted in the 2014 parliamentary elections.

All three proposals were supported by a majority of those voting, but turnout was slightly lower than the 2014 parliamentary elections, meaning the quorum was not met. However, as over 20% of registered voters voted in favour, the proposals will still have to be debated in the National Assembly. The National Assembly rejected to legalize anything of the three questions. 
Despite the insufficiency of 0.2% (12,000 people) of the turnout for the referendum to be 51% and to have mandatory effect, the turnout was based only on number of valid votes, not on number of voters. Some sections could not serve all the voters in reasonable time and a number waited on the line and could not vote, other sections closed earlier than the appointed time(8 PM) and in some sections entire boxes with ballots were locked in the sections themselves to avoid their enumeration. According to the Electoral Commission more than 12,000 ballots for not having envelope were excluded from the turnout alone.

Results

References

2016 in Bulgaria
2016
2016 referendums
Electoral reform referendums
November 2016 events in Europe